Freeman Dre and the Kitchen Party is a Folk Rock band from Toronto, Canada.

Background
Freeman Dre and the Kitchen Party is helmed by bandleader and singer-songwriter Andre (Dre) Flak. The origins of the band come from house parties where Dre and Lonny would play music in Dre's kitchen. The name "Kitchen Party" came from these parties, in the spirit of an east coast Kitchen Party or traditional Céilidh. The Kitchen Party is also a member of Fedora Upside Down, a musical collective begun by Dre and Mark Marczyk of The Lemon Bucket Orkestra. Fedora Upside Down has been described as a "motley assortment of cultural ambassadors" who spend "the summer taking over the city’s streets, parks, restaurants and bars with lively music and raucous dance parties."

Red Door, Second Floor
In 2010, the band released their debut album Red Door, Second Floor. The name of the album referred to Dre's Parkdale apartment. The album was produced by John Critchley and was met with favorable reviews. The album had rotation in Canada and in Britain on BBC radio.

Freeman Dre won "Best Songwriter" in the 2010 Now magazine "Best of Toronto Reader's Poll".

Old Town
In 2012, the band released their second album Old Town. The themes of the album reflect Dre's Polish and Irish ancestry, and the immigrant experience in Toronto. The album was produced by Dale Morningstar at The Gas Station studio on Toronto Island and was met with favourable reviews. The album was released at a party hosted at The Horseshoe Tavern in Toronto.

In 2012, Freeman Dre was nominated a second time for "Best Songwriter" by Now magazine.

During the 2013 Stanley Cup playoffs, the band produced a song dedicated to the Toronto Maple Leafs entitled Go Leafs, Go!. In 2013, the track "Whatever It Takes" off Old Town was used in a Season 3 episode of the Showcase series Lost Girl.

Vodka/Pickle EP

On November 23, 2013, they released their first single from their new album titled Wickedness, which was met with positive reviews. The single also features a B-side titled Apophenia. The single Wickedness was accompanied by a music video directed by Justin Friesen.

On May 16, 2015 the band released the six song Vodka/Pickle EP.

Reckless Good Intentions

The band began working on a third LP titled Reckless Good Intentions originally scheduled to be released June, 2016. Reckless Good Intentions was released June 9, 2017

Discography

Albums

 2010: Red Door, Second Floor, LP
 2012: Old Town, LP
 2015: Vodka/Pickle, EP
 2017: Reckless Good Intentions, LP

Singles

 2013: Wickedness
 2014: Of All The People
 2014: Never Went To Church Much

References

Musical groups from Toronto
Musical groups established in 2010
2010 establishments in Ontario